This is a list of destinations that Breeze Airways has operated to with scheduled flights . It does not include destinations operated to solely with charter flights. Originally established in July 2018, the American low-cost airline launched operations in May 2021. It operates a fleet of Airbus A220 and Embraer E-Jet aircraft on routes within the United States.

List

References

Lists of airline destinations